Mandala Stadium is a multi-purpose stadium in Jayapura, Papua, Indonesia. Founded in 1950 as Dock V Field, It is currently used mostly for football matches. It is the home stadium of one of the biggest and successful Liga 1 Indonesia team, Persipura Jayapura. The stadium holds 30,000 people and is the largest stadium in eastern Indonesia until Lukas Enembe Stadium was opened in 2019. This stadium is located in the Dok V area, near the centre of Jayapura as well as the Humboldt Bay.

See also 
Persipura Jayapura
List of stadiums in Indonesia
Jayapura

References 

Multi-purpose stadiums in Indonesia
Jayapura
Buildings and structures in Papua (province)
Sports venues in Indonesia
Football venues in Indonesia
Athletics (track and field) venues in Indonesia
Persipura Jayapura